Head shrinker can mean:

 A song by the band Oasis, appearing on the album The Masterplan
 A maker of shrunken heads
 A slang word for a mental health professional such as a psychiatrist or psychotherapist.
 The Headshrinkers, a professional wrestling tag team